Ngor Royal Cup (Thai: ถ้วยพระราชทาน ง.; ถ้วย ง.) is the lowest level of club football competition which competed in the tournament in Thailand since 1963. It was founded by Football Association of Thailand along with Khor Royal Cup in 1963. Locomotive Club - Health Department was the first team to win this competition.

In 1996, Ngor Royal Cup was downgraded to be the fifth-tier football tournament of Thai club football competition when Football Association of Thailand founded Thai Division 1 League as the second-tier in its place. Finally, in 2006, the tournament was downgraded to be the sixth-tier tournament due to the proposed merger of the Provincial League and Thai Premier League into one entity.

In 2016, Ngor Royal Cup was combined to Regional League Division 3 completely along with Khǒr Royal Cup and Khor Royal Cup by Football Association of Thailand and then Ngor Royal Cup become a trophy  for Thai Football Division 3.

Tournament format 
As it is the lowest division of Thai football, the clubs which are still in the division, and new ones which participate in the tournament by sending applications to the Football Association of Thailand, will take part of the tournament. The first round is the group stage, played in a round-robin basis, and the clubs are divided into groups of 3 or 4. The winners and the runners-up of each group qualify to the knock-out stage. Only the best eight, or the quarter-finalist clubs, of the tournament promote to the Khor Royal Cup next season, while there's no relegation and the remaining clubs are still in this division until they can reach the quarter-final round or promotional spots.

List of winners 

Note:
 Eliminated in the semi-final round.
 Eliminated in the quarter-final round.

References 

Football competitions in Thailand